Albert Virgili Fort (born 12 February 1983) is a Spanish retired footballer who played as a striker.

Club career
Born in Tarragona, Catalonia, Virgili emerged through Gimnàstic de Tarragona's youth ranks. He was promoted to the first team for 2001–02, but did not make any Segunda División appearances for the club – the season also ended in relegation – going on to resume his career in the lower leagues. In 2006, he returned to his native region and joined CF Pobla de Mafumet, Nàstic's farm team.

Virgili moved abroad in 2009, signing with Kitchee SC in Hong Kong. In the following transfer window, however, he rejoined Pobla; during his spell with the latter, he consistently ranked as team top scorer.

In March 2011, Virgili signed a contract with Gimnàstic, being an emergency replacement to severely injured Borja Viguera. His first match for the side occurred on 2 April, coming from the bench for Berry Powel in a 1–1 home draw against CD Tenerife; he scored his first second level goal on 15 May, netting the last in a 3–1 home win over Real Betis.

At the end of the campaign, Virgili was released and signed with neighbouring UE Llagostera in Segunda División B. On 15 July 2012 he returned to his previous team, freshly relegated from division two.

On 26 June 2013, after scoring just twice in 486 minutes of play during the third division season, Virgili was released by Gimnàstic. On 15 July, he signed with FC Ascó and, after just one season, the 30-year-old was appointed football coordinator at another former club Pobla de Mafumet, but continued to play as a senior for Ascó.

In July 2016, Virgili left Ascó and signed for CD Tortosa in the regional leagues, helping the club in their promotion to Primera Catalana in his first season. He moved to Andorran side Inter Club d'Escaldes in February 2018, subsequently retiring with the club in the end of the season at the age of 35.

References

External links

1983 births
Living people
Sportspeople from Tarragona
Spanish footballers
Footballers from Catalonia
Association football forwards
Segunda División players
Segunda División B players
Tercera División players
Gimnàstic de Tarragona footballers
CD Universidad de Zaragoza players
Real Zaragoza B players
Novelda CF players
CF Reus Deportiu players
CF Pobla de Mafumet footballers
UE Costa Brava players
Hong Kong First Division League players
Kitchee SC players
Inter Club d'Escaldes players
Spanish expatriate footballers
Expatriate footballers in Hong Kong
Expatriate footballers in Andorra
Spanish expatriate sportspeople in Hong Kong
Spanish expatriate sportspeople in Andorra